Pyotr Viktorovich Khrustovsky (31 May 1979 – 5 July 2003) was a Russian football player.

His last club, FC Ural Sverdlovsk Oblast, has retired his number 23.

References

1979 births
People from Kamyshin
2003 deaths
Russian footballers
FC Tekstilshchik Kamyshin players
FC Zhemchuzhina Sochi players
Russian Premier League players
FC Ural Yekaterinburg players
FC Rubin Kazan players
Road incident deaths in Russia
Association football forwards
FC Neftekhimik Nizhnekamsk players
Sportspeople from Volgograd Oblast